Alexandria... New York (translit. Iskandariyah.. New York) is a 2004 French-Egyptian drama film directed by Youssef Chahine. It was screened in the Un Certain Regard section at the 2004 Cannes Film Festival.

Cast
 Mahmoud Hemida - Yehia (old) (as Mahmoud Hemeida)
 Ahmed Yehia - Yehia (young) / Alexander
 Yousra - Ginger (old)
 Yousra El Lozy - Ginger (young)
 Lebleba - Jeannie
 Hala Sedki - Bonnie
 Magda El-Khatib - Shanewise (as Magda El Khatib)
 Nelly Karim - Carmen
 Mohamed Hasabo
 Sanaa Younes - La concierge
 Suad Nasr - Zoé
 Yousra Selim - Bonnie (jeune)
 Mahmoud Saad - Le directeur du Festival de New York
 Mahmoud El Lozy - The Dean
 Hamdy El Sakhawy - Eric
 Bushra - Corinne

References

External links

2004 films
2000s Arabic-language films
2004 drama films
Films directed by Youssef Chahine
Egyptian drama films
French drama films
2000s French films